Faris Glubb (19 October 1939 – 3 April 2004) was a British writer, journalist, translator and publisher.

Early life
He was born in Jerusalem, British Mandate of Palestine as Godfrey Peter Manley Glubb. He was the son of British officer Sir John Bagot Glubb KCB CMG DSO OBE MC, who, as the chief military advisor to the Jordanian military, became known as Glubb Pasha, and his wife, Muriel Rosemary Forbes. Sir John was commander of the Arab Legion. Godfrey grew up in Transjordan among Bedouin soldiers. He converted to Islam as soon as he was old enough according to Muslim customs. Afterwards, he was known outside his family as Faris Glubb. Faris had a sister Naomi, a Bedouin girl adopted in 1944 when she was three months old, and a sister Mary and brother John, who were Palestinian children adopted in 1948.

Glubb was sent to Wellington College, a "cane and bible" institution. Deeply unhappy, he ran away, to the Jordanian Embassy and the military attaché. He spent two years at Aiglon College in Switzerland, and then went to the School of Oriental and African Studies to study Arabic.

He became an activist with the Bertrand Russell Peace Foundation and the Popular Front for the Liberation of Oman, working with the Omani opposition at the United Nations in New York City.

Career
Glubb reported from Beirut during the Lebanese Civil War, first for CBS and later for the Daily Mail as Michael O'Sullivan. He also reported for Arab news agencies.  When the Israeli Government expelled the Palestinian leadership from Lebanon, Glubb followed. He had close relationships with the Popular Front for the Liberation of Palestine, and with the writer Ghassan Kanafani. He published several books, notably Zionism: Is It Racist?, The Palestine Question and International Law and Zionist Relations with Nazism.  When he died, he was seeking his doctorate in Arabic at the School of Oriental and African studies about relationships between Richard the Lionheart and Saladin from Vatican documents.

Death
He died in Kuwait on 3 April 2004 as the result of a hit-and-run road accident. He was survived by his second wife, Salwa and their two daughters Sarah and Darina, and his son Mark (Mubarak) by his first marriage. His mother Lady Rosemary Glubb also survived him, but died in September 2005.

References

1939 births
2004 deaths
British Muslims
Converts to Islam
Pedestrian road incident deaths
20th-century British historians
Alumni of SOAS University of London
Alumni of Aiglon College